Robert "Bob" Dreyfuss is an American investigative journalist and contributing editor for The Nation magazine. His work has appeared in Rolling Stone, The Diplomat, Mother Jones, The American Prospect, TomPaine.com, and other progressive publications.

Career
In the late 1970s and early 1980s, Dreyfuss was Middle East Intelligence director of the Executive Intelligence Review, the flagship journal of the Lyndon LaRouche movement. In the 1990s Dreyfuss wrote on intelligence issues and foreign affairs, and profiled a number of organizations and public figures, including then governor of Texas, George W. Bush, and senators Trent Lott and John McCain.  Since the September 11, 2001 attacks, he has written about the War on Terrorism and the Iraq War.

Hostage to Khomeini
His 1981 book, Hostage to Khomeini, was commissioned by Lyndon LaRouche. In the book Robert Dreyfuss provides a detailed explanation of why the Carter administration was fooled into supporting the Khomeini revolutionaries  but Khomeini backstabbed the US after the Shah was brought to the US for treatment. The book discusses how various officials in the Carter administration believed that an Islamic Iran could export the Islamic revolution to the Soviet Muslims and cause a break-up of the Soviet Union. Dreyfuss accused Cyrus Hashemi of being a CIA and Mossad agent. Cyrus Hashemi subsequently sued Dreyfuss and Lyndon Larouche.

The Devil's Game

The Devil's Game, published in 2005, is an analysis of how the United States and United Kingdom used Islamists as a powerful weapon against Communists and nationalists in the Muslim world. He believes that the US labelled any nations' leaders who were unwilling to work with the US as Communists. Dreyfuss asserts that the Muslim Brotherhood is historically connected with the CIA and other western intelligence services. He also claims the CIA and the West used the Muslim Brotherhood in an attempt to overthrow President Nasser of Egypt because he nationalized the Suez Canal and kicked many US and European companies out of Egypt. The book makes claims that the Israelis used the Muslim Brotherhood in 1982 in an unsuccessful attempt to destroy President Assad of Syria during the uprisings in Homs and Hama. Lastly Dreyfuss covers the CIA and British backed 1953 Iranian coup d'état.

Bibliography
Hostage to Khomeini, cowritten with Thierry LeMarc, New Benjamin Franklin House, 1981.  - PDF download
Devil's Game: How the United States Helped Unleash Fundamentalist Islam, Metropolitan Books, 2005.

References

External links
 Dreyfuss web site
 

American male journalists
American investigative journalists
American foreign policy writers
American male non-fiction writers
American political writers
Writers on the Middle East
LaRouche movement
Year of birth missing (living people)
Living people